Round Valley is a census-designated place (CDP) in Gila County, Arizona, United States. The population was 487 at the 2010 census.

Geography
The CDP is located in northern Gila County, just south of the town of Payson. Arizona State Route 87, the Beeline Highway, forms the western edge of the CDP and runs north  to the center of Payson.

Demographics

History
Round Valley was the site of the Gibson Ranch in the late 19th century into the 20th century:

References

Census-designated places in Gila County, Arizona